The Little Church in the Pines is a c. 1902-1908 building in the former mining town of Salina in Boulder County, Colorado. The church held regular Sunday School classes for children, and services whenever a traveling minister came to town. As the mining boom came to an end and the town's population shrunk, the building fell into disuse, and briefly served as a mine office before being abandoned. In 1948 it was purchased by a neighborhood group and has been used ever since for nondenominational worship and community events. The Little Church in the Pines was placed on the National Register of Historic Places in 1989.

During the 2013 Colorado floods, the ground washed out from underneath half of the building, including the bell tower, and emergency supports had to be installed to stabilize the structure until a new foundation could be built and the area refilled.

References

Churches completed in 1902
Buildings and structures in Boulder County, Colorado
Churches in Boulder County, Colorado
Churches on the National Register of Historic Places in Colorado
National Register of Historic Places in Boulder County, Colorado